El Cocuy National Park is a national park located in the Andes Mountains within the nation of Colombia.  Its official name is Parque Nacional Natural El Cocuy.

Geology
Because of its high altitude, and although it is located close to the equator, El Cocuy is characterized by post-glacial geological morphology, including steep slopes, cirques, moraines, and glacier-gouged lakes La Pintada and La Cuadrada.  The park's topography covers 4,500 meters (15,000 feet) from its lowest point to its highest point.  The park is visited by climbers and rockclimbers of all skill levels.

Geography
El Cocuy National Park is located in the Department of Boyacá, near the villages of El Cocuy and Güicán.

Current events
The national park's glacial heritage has made climate change a key element in the park's future. An 1851 watercolor of the "Great Snowfields near Güicán" shows Mount Chita fully capped in snow. , the national park's historic icefield has shrunk to scattered snowcaps, and is expected to entirely disappear within a few decades.

References

External links
 Images of El Cocuy
 Parque Nacional Natural El Cocuy Spanish-language National Park website.

Parks in Colombia
Geography of Boyacá Department
Tourist attractions in Boyacá Department